Wu Li-hua (born 12 August 1969), known in the Rukai language as Saidhai Tahovecahe, is a Taiwanese Rukai educator and politician. She is the first legislator of the Democratic Progressive Party to represent the Highland Aborigine Constituency, to which she was elected in 2020.

Early life and teaching career
Wu is from Wanshan Village, in Maolin District, Kaohsiung. She was born on 12 August 1969, to a mother of Rukai descent, and a father of Mainland Chinese descent. She earned degrees from the National Pingtung University of Education, and, during a 27-year career in education, served as a principal within two primary schools in Pingtung County.

Political career
Wu worked in the Pingtung County Government under the administration of magistrate Pan Men-an starting in 2016. She was credited with increasing the vote share among the indigenous population for Pan. In Pan's administration, Wu was the director-general of the Indigenous Peoples Department and later the director of the Bureau of Cultural Affairs. She was subsequently appointed to the Indigenous Historical Justice and Transitional Justice Committee. In this capacity, Wu was one of the signatories of an open letter addressed to Xi Jinping on behalf of Taiwanese indigenous people in January 2019, shortly after he had commented on Chinese unification and the political status of Taiwan.

In August 2019, Wu was nominated by the Democratic Progressive Party to run for legislative office in the multimember Highland Aborigine Constituency. In January 2020, Wu was elected to the Legislative Yuan as one of three representatives in the Highland Aborigine Constituency. She succeeded Chien Tung-ming, who did not run for reelection. With her electoral victory, Wu became the first Democratic Progressive Party legislator to represent the Highland Aborigine Constituency.

References

1969 births
Living people
Members of the 10th Legislative Yuan
Aboriginal Members of the Legislative Yuan
Democratic Progressive Party Members of the Legislative Yuan
Women school principals and headteachers
Politicians of the Republic of China on Taiwan from Kaohsiung
Heads of schools in Taiwan
National Pingtung University of Education alumni
Rukai people
20th-century Taiwanese educators
21st-century Taiwanese educators
Politicians of the Republic of China on Taiwan from Pingtung County
21st-century Taiwanese women politicians
20th-century women educators
21st-century women educators